Star Wars: Clone Wars is an American 2D-animated television series set in the Star Wars universe, developed by Genndy Tartakovsky for Cartoon Network. Set between the Star Wars prequel trilogy films Attack of the Clones and Revenge of the Sith, it is amongst the first of many works to explore the conflict known as the Clone Wars. The show follows the actions of various prequel trilogy characters, notably Jedi and clone troopers, in their war against the droid armies of the Confederacy of Independent Systems and the Sith.

The series aired on Cartoon Network for three seasons consisting of 25 episodes altogether from November 7, 2003, to March 25, 2005, and was the first Star Wars television series since Ewoks (1985–1986). The first two seasons of Clone Wars, released on DVD as "Volume One", were produced in episodes ranging from two to three minutes, while the third season consists of five 12-minute episodes comprising "Volume Two". Since its release, the series has received critical acclaim and won multiple awards, including the Primetime Emmy Award for Outstanding Animated Program for both volumes. Its success led to it being spun off as the half-hour CGI series The Clone Wars in 2008.

Plot 
The series begins shortly after Attack of the Clones, as the failing Galactic Republic and the Jedi are under siege from the Separatist Confederacy of Independent Systems and the Sith. As the war rages, more and more planets slip from Republic control.

Synopsis 
The main storyline of Volume One features the Jedi Knight Obi-Wan Kenobi leading an assault on the planet Muunilinst, home of the Intergalactic Banking Clan, benefactors of the Separatists wishing to break away from the Republic. The Banking Clan have hired the bounty hunter Durge to command their droid armies on the battlefield. Obi-Wan's apprentice, Anakin Skywalker, is personally appointed to lead the space forces by Supreme Chancellor Palpatine. Meanwhile, Separatist leader Count Dooku takes the Force-sensitive Asajj Ventress as his Sith apprentice and sends her to eliminate Anakin. On Yavin 4, Anakin manages to defeat Ventress in a lightsaber duel by drawing on his anger.

Surrounding this storyline are various battles focusing on other Jedi and their wartime exploits: Master Mace Windu faces a droid army unarmed on Dantooine, Master Yoda travels to the ice world Ilum to save two imperiled Jedi, the amphibious Kit Fisto leads an aquatic regiment of clone troopers on the waterworld Mon Cala, and a group of Jedi encounter the dreaded Jedi hunter General Grievous on Hypori.

In Volume Two, Obi-Wan sends his team of ARC troopers to Hypori to rescue the Jedi from Grievous. The Republic is desperate and, after much consideration, the Jedi Council decides to promote Anakin to the rank of Jedi Knight. The series then jumps ahead to nearly the end of the war, when Anakin has become a more powerful Jedi. He aids Obi-Wan in capturing a fortress, saves Saesee Tiin in space battle, and rescues Jedi from crab droids.

Anakin and Obi-Wan are assigned to search for Grievous on the planet Nelvaan, but instead end up liberating a group of Nelvaanians who had been enslaved and mutated by the Separatist Techno Union. While rescuing the Nelvaan warriors, Anakin sees a cryptic vision of his eventual transformation into Darth Vader. Meanwhile, Grievous leads an assault on Coruscant and, despite the best efforts of Yoda, Mace Windu, Shaak Ti, and others, kidnaps Palpatine. Anakin and Obi-Wan then set out to rescue the Chancellor over Coruscant, leading directly into the beginning of Revenge of the Sith.

Continuity 
Several attempts were made to maintain continuity with the overall saga, most notably bridging Attack of the Clones and Revenge of the Sith. Anakin appears with his new lightsaber (as it appears in Episode III) after his first was destroyed in the previous film. In "Chapter 21",  makes his first appearance in gold plating and Anakin is knighted; he sends his Padawan braid to Padmé, who stores it with the necklace he gave her in The Phantom Menace. In "Chapter 22", Anakin appears with the facial scar he has in Revenge of the Sith, and it is implied that Anakin and Padmé may have conceived the Skywalker twins on Naboo.

The series is notable for introducing Revenge of the Sith villain General Grievous (in "Chapter 20"), although some of his personality traits had yet to be finalized. According to Tartakovsky, George Lucas initially pitched Grievous to him and his crew as "this ruthless, totally capable Jedi killer," but later developed him into "one of those old B-serial villains who does something bad ... twirls his mustache and then he runs off." The character was given a cough in Revenge of the Sith, intended to emphasize his organic nature as well as the flaws of having cyborg prosthetics. His depiction in Clone Wars lacked a cough until the concluding episode, in which Mace Windu Force-crushes the chestplate housing Grievous's internal organs; this was intended to create continuity with the film and was mentioned in its novelization. Conversely, the CGI The Clone Wars series (2008–2014, 2020) depicts Grievous as already being in this weakened state.

Volume Two shares aspects of its storyline with the novel Labyrinth of Evil, which was created at the same time. Both the cartoon and book climax with the Jedi chasing Grievous on Coruscant to save Palpatine. The book features a different final duel between Windu and Grievous, but in both titles Shaak Ti acts as Palpatine's primary guardian. In the series, Anakin and Obi-Wan investigate a possible base for Grievous on Nelvaan before being called back to Coruscant. The novel depicts the Jedi duo pursuing Count Dooku on Tythe; while fleeing to Coruscant, Dooku stops at Nelvaan to leave a false trail. While the final season of The Clone Wars references Shaak Ti being sent to guard Palpatine, it depicts Anakin and Obi-Wan in yet a different location just prior to Revenge of the Sith.

Clone Wars served as a pilot for the half-hour CGI The Clone Wars. The character designer for the latter series attempted to translate aspects of the character designs from the 2D series to 3D. It was originally reported that the 2008 series would not supersede the continuity of the 2003 series, but following Disney's acquisition of Lucasfilm, in 2014, it was announced that the CGI The Clone Wars would officially be considered canon, while the 2003 series and most other spin-off works would not.

Production 
Lucasfilm reportedly conceived of the series as a way to sell more action figures because the prequel trilogy figures were underselling. It was produced and directed by Genndy Tartakovsky, the creator of Dexter's Laboratory and Samurai Jack, and employs a similar animation style to the latter. According to Tartakovsky, the series was developed in two weeks and created by a small crew and "it was stressful because I had to translate this world I've loved since I was a kid into something completely different."

Tartakovsky stated that he deliberately animated  with moveable expressive eyes to pay homage to his animated appearances in the Star Wars Holiday Special and Droids. Additionally, the planet Nelvaan's name was a nod to Nelvana, the production company that produced all previous Star Wars animated series. In "Chapter 21", a Dulok appears, a species introduced in Ewoks. According to art director Paul Rudish, the Banking Clan planet of Muunilinst was designed to look like a U.S. dollar bill.

Although the show was largely animated in digital 2D, the motion of the spaceships was cell-shaded 3D animation.

Voice cast 
 Mat Lucas as Anakin Skywalker
 Frankie Ryan Manriquez as young Anakin Skywalker
 James Arnold Taylor as Obi-Wan Kenobi and Agen Kolar
 Tom Kane as Yoda
 Terrence "T.C." Carson as Mace Windu and Saesee Tiin
 Anthony Daniels as C-3PO
 Corey Burton as San Hill and Count Dooku
 Grey DeLisle as Asajj Ventress, Padmé Amidala, Shaak Ti, and Stass Allie
 Nick Jameson as Palpatine / Darth Sidious
 André Sogliuzzo as Commander Cody, Captain Typho, Captain Fordo, and all clone troopers
 Richard McGonagle as General Grievous and Kit Fisto
 Fred Tatasciore as Qui-Gon Jinn and Oppo Rancisis
 Daran Norris as Ki-Adi-Mundi, Durge, Master Barrek, and Even Piell
 Cree Summer as Luminara Unduli
 Tatyana Yassukovich as Barriss Offee
 Kevin Michael Richardson as K'Kruhk

Broadcast 
The series originally ran on Cartoon Network. In addition to being shown on television, the episodes were released online simultaneously on the Star Wars and Cartoon Network websites. It was heavily advertised by the channel, and was originally shown immediately before their popular Friday-night programming block, 'Fridays'.

Episodes

Season 1 (2003) 
The first season consisted of 10 episodes, lasting three minutes each. Along with the second season, it was released on DVD as Volume One.

Season 2 (2004) 
The second season consisted of 10 episodes, lasting three minutes each. Along with the first season, it was released on DVD as Volume One.

Season 3 (2005) 
The third and final season consisted of five episodes, lasting 12 minutes each. These episodes were released on DVD as Volume Two.

Reception

Critical response 
As of 2019, the review aggregator website Rotten Tomatoes lists four out of five critics as giving season 1 a positive review. In 2009, Clone Wars was ranked 21 on IGN's Top 100 Animated Series list.

Various articles have been written about the series since its 2021 release on Disney+. ComicBook.com writes that it "is worth a watch for any fan of magnificent animation". SyFy Wire's Phil Pirrello rated the series as the best Star Wars television production ever produced, writing that Tartakovsky "gave Star Wars its most dynamic visuals ever as he tackled all the Clone Wars action and conflict Lucas left out of his big-screen prequels." Pirrello continues: "[W]hat Clone Wars lacks in intricate storytelling it more than makes up for with stunning animation and stirring action scenes. The mini-episodes are bare bones by design, as Tartakovsky employs a pure visual storytelling execution ... The franchise has only taken such a bold stylistic risk this one time." Collider's Liam Gaughan calls the series "ahead of its time" and says it "better utilized the environments, planets, and tech designs [than] the prequels" as well as "side characters better suited for a brief adventure", concluding that it is "a striking piece of standalone animation that doesn't require comprehensive knowledge of the universe" and "a groundbreaking work of art". Elijah Beahm of The Escapist states that the series "took effectively everything people loved and hated about the prequel films – and made it work."

In a list of "Best Animated Star Wars Moments", /Film credits the series with marking "the arrival of a new era for animated storytelling that seriously expanded the canon of the galaxy far, far away", specifically praising the dialogue-free scenes of Mace Windu fighting battle droids without a lightsaber (calling it "a dream seeing the legend in action") and Anakin's premonitory hallucination of Vader's helmet on a cave wall (drawing a parallel to Luke's vision on Dagobah in The Empire Strikes Back).

Awards and nominations

Home media 
Both volumes were released on DVD by 20th Century Fox Home Entertainment, making it one of the few Cartoon Network original shows not to have their home releases released through Warner Home Video. Both volumes were released on Disney+ on April 2, 2021.

Merchandising 
A series of Hasbro action figures was released between 2003 and 2005, including four Walmart-exclusive "Commemorative DVD Collection" 3-packs (which did not include a DVD). Between 2004 and 2007, Dark Horse Comics published a ten-volume comic series titled Clone Wars – Adventures, which utilized the style of the 2D animated series and depicts original stories set during the era. In 2021, more toys were released to promote the series, as part of Star Wars: The Vintage Collection.

Legacy 
Elements of the series, including the regenerative villain Durge, are mentioned in the 2005 novelization of Revenge of the Sith. According to the (now-defunct) Star Wars Databank, Durge has a vendetta against Mandalorians and extends this to the clones of Jango Fett. Durge was considered for inclusion in The Clone Wars, but was dropped in favor new bounty-hunter character Cad Bane. Durge also appears in a 2021 issue of the canon Marvel comic book series Doctor Aphra, as part of the War of the Bounty Hunters crossover event, set between The Empire Strikes Back and Return of the Jedi. The 2023 video game Jedi: Survivor features a member of Durge's species, the Gen'dai.

Nelvaan has been mentioned in canon reference books. Versions of the medieval-style Jedi knighting ceremony have appeared in canon works such as Star Wars Rebels and Jedi: Fallen Order. A 2022 Comic Book Resources (CBR) article opines that certain elements of the series which do not conflict with more recent works "are good enough to deserve canon status", such as the duel between Anakin and Ventress, the introduction of Grievous, and the knighting ceremony. The 2022 Clone Wars novel Brotherhood establishes a new origin for Ventress, which CBR interprets as definitively demoting the series to non-canon status, calling the implication "a shame". The book's author, Mike Chen, explains that he viewed Ventress and Skywalker's duel from Clone Wars as "kind of canon", like animated Republic propaganda of Anakin's encounters with Dooku's agents (as referenced in the novel).

References 
Footnotes

Citations

External links 

 
 
 

2003 American television series debuts
2005 American television series endings
2000s American animated television series
2000s American science fiction television series
American children's animated action television series
American children's animated space adventure television series
American children's animated science fiction television series
Cartoon Network original programming
Television series by Cartoon Network Studios
Interquel television series
Clone Wars
Television series by Rough Draft Studios
Television series by Lucasfilm
Toonami
Animated television shows based on films
English-language television shows
Emmy Award-winning programs
Military science fiction television series
Animated television series about extraterrestrial life
Anime-influenced Western animated television series
Annie Award winners
Television series created by Genndy Tartakovsky